Burney is a hill in Cumbria, England, to the north of the A5092 road between Greenodd and Broughton-in-Furness. It is the subject of a chapter of Wainwright's book The Outlying Fells of Lakeland. It reaches  and has a trig point at the summit.  It is also known as Great Burney, and a slight rise on the north ridge is named Little Burney.

References

Fells of the Lake District